Charles Henry Colton (October 15, 1848 – May 9, 1915) was an American prelate of the Roman Catholic Church. He served as bishop of the Diocese of Buffalo in New York from 1903 until his death in 1915.

Biography

Early life and education 
Charles Colton was born on June 10, 1876, in New York City to Patrick Smith and Teresa Augusta (née Mullin) Colton, both Irish immigrants. He received his early education at Public School No. 5 and the Latin school of St. Stephen's Parish in Manhattan. As a boy, he held a clerical position in a dry goods store. In 1869, Colton entered St. Francis Xavier College in Manhattan, graduating in 1873. He then studied theology at St. Joseph's Seminary in Troy, New York.

Priesthood 
Colton was ordained to the priesthood for the Archdiocese of New York on June 10, 1876. His first assignment was as a curate at St. Stephen's under Father Edward McGlynn. He remained at St. Stephen's for ten years, also serving as a chaplain at Bellevue Hospital in Manhattan. In 1886, Colton was named pastor of Our Lady of Mercy Parish in Port Chester, New York.

Following the McGlynn excommunication, Colton returned to St. Stephen's in 1887 to assist Father Arthur Donnelly, who had been assigned as temporary administrator. Later that year, he assumed the role of St. Stephen's upon Donnelly's resignation. He enjoyed remarkable success in his new post, restoring harmony among the congregation, eliminating the parish debt of $152,000, and establishing a parochial school. In addition to his pastoral duties, he became chancellor of the Archdiocese of New York in 1896.

Bishop of Buffalo 
On June 10, 1903, Colton was appointed the fourth bishop of the Diocese of Buffalo by Pope Leo XIII. He received his episcopal consecration on August 24, 1903, from Archbishop John Farley, with Bishops Bernard McQuaid and Charles McDonnell serving as co-consecrators, in St. Patrick's Cathedral in Manhattan. During his tenure, the diocese was composed of 72 churches, 18 combination school-churches, 30 schools, 12 academies, 13 hospitals, and charitable institutions, 6 convents, and 28 rectories.

On December 17, 1905, a gold cross was stolen from Colton after a church celebration. The cross, valued at $1,000, was cut from Colton's vestments as he was exiting St. Nicholas Ukrainian Catholic Church in Buffalo.

Death 
Bishop Colton died in Buffalo on May 9, 1915, aged 66. He is buried in the crypt of St. Joseph's Cathedral, Buffalo.

References

1848 births
1915 deaths
20th-century Roman Catholic bishops in the United States
Clergy from New York City
Roman Catholic bishops of Buffalo